Brentwood School District serves Brentwood, Missouri and is home to a national blue ribbon winning High School, Brentwood High School.

About
Founded in 1920, BSD serves all of Brentwood. BSD has 797 students with 79 teachers over 5 schools. The student demographics are 60% Caucasian, 20% African American, 6% Asian, 5% Latino and 9% Other/Multiracial. The graduation rate is 95%. Missouri Department of Elementary and Secondary Education reported Brentwood School District as the only school district in the St. Louis Area to get 100% on academic health

List of Schools
Pre-K
Brentwood Early Childhood Center
Elementary
McGrath Elementary 
Mark Twain Elementary 
Middle
Brentwood Middle 
High School
Brentwood High School

References

School districts in Missouri
Education in St. Louis County, Missouri
1920 establishments in Missouri
School districts established in 1920